Statistics of Division 2 in the 1948–49 season.

Overview
It was contested by 19 teams, and Lens won the championship.

League standings

1. FC Saarbrücken took part in the competition as a guest team and finished in first place with a reported record of 26 wins, 7 draws and 5 defeats from 38 games, but were refused promotion or further participation.

References

External links
France - List of final tables (RSSSF)

French
2
Ligue 2 seasons